Petar "Peđa" Vasiljević (Serbian Cyrillic: Петар Пеђа Bacиљeвић; born 3 November 1970) is a Serbian former footballer who played as a central defender.

Football career
Born in Belgrade, Vasiljević started his career with local and national powerhouse FK Partizan, being an important part of the squad that won two national championships and as many Yugoslav Cups. In the 1994 summer he moved to Spain where he remained for the following six years, in representation of CA Osasuna (two spells) and Albacete Balompié.

Vasiljević's only season in La Liga was 1995–96, as he started in 21 of his 22 league appearances for Albacete, who ranked in 20th position and suffered relegation. After leaving the country in 2000, he played with Rot Weiss Ahlen in Germany and FK Obilić, returning later in the decade to Osasuna to work in several capacities (youth coach, co-director of football).

On 5 January 2017, Vasiljević became Osasuna's third manager of the top flight season after replacing fired Joaquín Caparrós. He signed until 30 June.

Managerial statistics

References

External links

1970 births
Living people
Footballers from Belgrade
Yugoslav footballers
Serbian footballers
Association football defenders
Yugoslav First League players
FK Partizan players
FK Obilić players
La Liga players
Segunda División players
CA Osasuna players
Albacete Balompié players
2. Bundesliga players
Rot Weiss Ahlen players
Serbian expatriate footballers
Expatriate footballers in Spain
Expatriate footballers in Germany
Serbian expatriate sportspeople in Spain
Serbian expatriate sportspeople in Germany
Serbian football managers
La Liga managers
CA Osasuna managers
Serbian expatriate football managers
Expatriate football managers in Spain